Ori Dagan (born June 8, 1981) is a jazz singer-songwriter based in Toronto, Canada. He has released four studio albums including "Click Right Here" (2022) with which he made his European debut at the Skopje Summer Festival in Macedonia. The album's contemporary lyrics contrasted with traditional jazz instrumentation received positive reviews, as well as winning the Grand Prize from the Great American Song Contest for the song "Viruses," a collaboration with rapper Erik Flow. To date, Dagan has released eighteen music videos, including the twelve videos accompanying Nathaniel: A Tribute to Nat King Cole as well as "Googleable" (2012), "Bad Romance" (2012), and "Clap on the 2 and the 4" (2016). Ori has played festivals and showcases around the world including SXSW, TD Toronto Jazz Festival, Canadian Music Week, Jazz Sudbury Festival and TanJazz.

Early life

Born in Haifa, Israel, Dagan grew up playing classical piano; he moved to Toronto with his family at the age of eight.,. When he gave up classical piano at age sixteen, Dagan turned to writing poetry before he was inspired by Ella Fitzgerald’s scat solos to pursue jazz. He began his singing career by performing at jam sessions around Toronto around 2000, including sessions at The Rex Hotel, The Poor Alex Theatre and regularly at Lisa Particelli’s Girls Night Out jazz jam.

Education

Dagan’s first mentor in jazz was saxophonist Bob Mover, with whom he spent several years studying privately. In 2002, after spending two years at the University of Toronto studying English Literature, he pursued a BFA at York University studying jazz vocals and classical voice, graduating in 2007. He spent two additional years of study at Humber College’s music program, focusing on songwriting and performance study.

Musical collaborations

Dagan’s debut album S’Cat Got My Tongue featured a total of 15 musicians, including duets with Toronto-based vocalists Heather Bambrick, Terra Hazelton, Julie Michels, and Sophia Perlman. His sophomore album Less Than Three <3 featured guest appearances by multi-instrumentalist Jane Bunnett and the Eric St-Laurent Trio. Nathaniel: A Tribute to Nat King Cole features Bunnett, as well as duets with Alex Pangman and Sheila Jordan. Together with JUNO-winning Canadian Dance Vocalist Simone Denny, Ori Dagan recorded a jazz version of The Buggles' classic, "Video Killed the Radio Star," a bonus track on his 2022 album "Click Right Here."

Discography

Album 

 S'Cat Got My Tongue (ScatCat Records, 2009)
 Less Than Three <3 (ScatCat Records, 2012)
 Nathaniel: A Tribute to Nat King Cole (ScatCat Records, 2017)
 Click Right Here (ScatCat Records, 2022)

Singles 

 "The Christmas Song" (duet with Renee Yoxon) (Scatcat Records, 2015)
 "Clap on the Two and the Four" (ScatCat Records, 2016)
 "Video Killed the Radio Star" (with Simone Denny) (ScatCat Records, 2021)

Awards 
 2010- CBC Radio 1- Canada's Next Top Crooner
 2013- NOW Magazine Readers' Poll- Best Male Vocalist
 2013- Australian Independent Music Video Awards- Best Independent Music Video for "Googleable"
 2013- Australian Independent Music Video Awards- Best Independent Music Video – Jazz for "Googleable"
 2014- NOW Magazine Readers' Poll- Best Male Vocalist- Runner-Up
 2015- Toronto Independent Music Awards- Best Jazz Vocals
 2015- Hollywood Songwriting Contest- Best Children's Song for "Clap on the 2 and the 4"
 2016- New York City Jazz Film Festival- Best Educational Jazz Short for "Clap on the 2 and the 4"
 2016- Polish International Film Festival- Best Jazz Song for "Clap on the 2 and the 4"
 2016- Global Music Awards- Best Male Vocalist for "Clap on the 2 and the 4"- Bronze Medal winner
 2017- Global Music Awards- Best Album for Nathaniel: A Tribute to Nat King Cole- Silver Medal winner
 2017- Open World Toronto Film Festival- Best Music Video for "Sting of the Cactus"
 2017- Nevada Film Festival- Platinum Reel Award for "Sting of the Cactus"
2018- The American Songwriting Award- Best Jazz Song for " Sweetheart"
2018- LA Music Video Awards- Best Animation Music Video for " Sting of the Cactus"
2018- Rincón International Film Festival- Best Music Video for "Sting of the Cactus"
2018- Honolulu Film Awards- Silver Lei for Music Video for "Sting of the Cactus"
2018- South Georgian Bay Film Festival- Silver Award Best Music Video for "Sting of the Cactus"
2018- WorldFest-Houston International Film & Video Festival- Silver Remi Award for Best Jazz Music Video for "Sting of the Cactus
2018- Canadian Diversity Film Festival- Best Music Video for "Sweetheart"
2018- Colorado International Activism Film Festival- Best Actor/Singer for a Non-Animated Short/Music Video for "Complexion"
2021- NOW Magazine Readers Best Local Artist Or Group 
2022- The Great American Song Contest Winner "Best Special Category Music"

References

1981 births
Living people
Canadian jazz singers
Canadian jazz songwriters
21st-century Canadian male singers